Murraysville is an unincorporated community in northern Jackson County, West Virginia, United States, along the Ohio River across from Long Bottom, Ohio.  It lies along Murraysville Road, north of the city of Ripley, the county seat of Jackson County.  Its elevation is 591 feet (180 m).

See also
List of cities and towns along the Ohio River

References

Unincorporated communities in Jackson County, West Virginia
Unincorporated communities in West Virginia
West Virginia populated places on the Ohio River